Actinocephalidae is a family of parasitic alveolates of the phylum Apicomplexia

Taxonomy

Thirty eight genera are recognised in this family.

History

This taxon was created by Leger in 1892.

Description

Species in this taxon infect insects.

References

Apicomplexa families